Bridouxia leucoraphe is a species of tropical freshwater snail with a gill and an operculum, an aquatic gastropod mollusk in the family Paludomidae.

This species is found in Burundi, the Democratic Republic of the Congo, Tanzania, and Zambia. Its natural habitat is freshwater lakes.

References

Paludomidae
Gastropods described in 1890
Taxa named by César Marie Félix Ancey
Taxonomy articles created by Polbot
Taxobox binomials not recognized by IUCN